Valor (lit. Valour) is a conservative political party in Guatemala.

History
The party was established in 2017 by Ana Ingrid Bernat Cofiño. The party was initially re-founded with the tab of the late Progressive Liberation Party. It has 27 thousand affiliates. The first public act was in May 2017. Its leader is the former presidential candidate Zury Ríos.

Election results

Congress of the Republic

President of the Republic of Guatemala

Notes

References

External links

2017 establishments in Guatemala
Conservative parties in Guatemala
Political parties established in 2017
Protestantism in Guatemala
Protestant political parties